The Ministry of Education ( MoE; formerly the Ministry of Human Resource Development from 1985 to 2020) is a ministry of the Government of India, responsible for the implementation of the National Policy on Education. The ministry is further divided into two departments: the Department of School Education and Literacy, which deals with primary, secondary and higher secondary education, adult education and literacy, and the Department of Higher Education, which deals with university level education, technical education, scholarships, etc.

The current education minister is Dharmendra Pradhan, a member of the Council of Ministers. India had a Ministry of Education since 1947. In 1985, the Rajiv Gandhi government changed its name to the Ministry of Human Resource Development (MHRD), and with the public announcement of the newly drafted "National Education Policy 2020" by the Narendra Modi government, the Ministry of Human Resource Development was renamed back to the Ministry of Education.

Policy 

The new National Education Policy 2020 was passed on 29 July 2020 by the Union Council of Ministers. The NEP 2020 replaced the existing National Policy on Education, 1986. Under the NEP 2020, the name of the Ministry of Human Resource and Development (MHRD) was changed to Ministry of Education (MoE). Numerous new educational institutes, bodies and concepts were legislated under NEP 2020.

Department of School Education and Literacy 
The Department of School Education and Literacy is responsible for the development of school education and literacy in the country.
Central Board of Secondary Education (CBSE)
Central Tibetan School Administration (CTSA)
Kendriya Vidyalaya Sangathan (KVS)
National Council of Educational Research and Training (NCERT)
National Council for Teacher Education 
National Foundation for Teachers' Welfare
National Institute of Open Schooling (NIOS)
Navodaya Vidyalaya Samiti (NVS)

Department of Higher Education

The Department of Higher Education is in charge of secondary and post-secondary education. The department is empowered to grant deemed university status to educational institutions on the advice of the University Grants Commission (UGC) of India, under Section 3 of the University Grants Commission (UGC) Act, 1956. The Department of Higher Education takes care of one of the largest higher education systems of the world, just after the United States and China. The department is engaged in bringing world-class opportunities of higher education and research to the country so that Indian students are not found lacking when facing an international platform. For this, the government has launched joint ventures and signed MoUs to help the Indian students benefit from world opinion. The technical education system in the country can be broadly classified into three categories – Central Government funded institutions, State Government/State-funded institutions & Self-financed institutions. The 122 Centrally funded institution of technical and science education are as under: List of centrally funded technical institutions: IIITs (25), IITs (23), IIMs (20), IISc Bangalore, IISERs (7 - Berhampur, Bhopal, Kolkata, Mohali, Pune, Thiruvananthapuram, Tirupati), NITs (31), NITTTRs (4), and 9 others (SPA, ISMU, NERIST, SLIET, IIEST, NITIE & NIFFT, CIT)

Organisational structure
The department is divided into eight bureaus, and most of the work of the department is handled through over 100 autonomous organisations under these bureaus.

University and Higher Education; Minorities Education 

 University Grants Commission (UGC)
 Education Research and Development Organisation (ERDO)
 Indian Council of Social Science Research (ICSSR)
 Indian Council of Historical Research (ICHR)
 Indian Council of Philosophical Research (ICPR)
 52 Central university (India) as on 11.09.2021 list issued by University Grants Commission

Technical Education 

 All India Council of Technical Education (AICTE)
 Council of Architecture (COA)
23 Indian Institutes of Technology (IITs)
31 National Institutes of Technology (NITs)
25 Indian Institutes of Information Technology (IIITs)
 Indian Institute of Engineering Science and Technology, Shibpur (IIEST)

 20 Indian Institutes of Management (IIMs)
 Indian Institute of Science (IISc)

 7 Indian Institutes of Science Education and Research (IISERs)

 North Eastern Regional Institute of Science and Technology (NERIST)
 National Institute of Industrial Engineering (NITIE)
 National Institute of Foundry and Forge Technology (NIFFT)
 4 National Institutes of Technical Teachers' Training & Research (NITTTRs) (Bhopal, Chandigarh, Chennai and Kolkata)
 4 Regional Boards of Apprenticeship / Practical Training
 3 School of Planning and Architecture (SPAs)

Administration and Languages

Three Deemed Universities in the field of Sanskrit, viz. 

 Rashtriya Sanskrit Sansthan (RSkS) in New Delhi,
 Shri Lal Bahadur Shastri Rashtriya Sanskrit Vidyapeeth (SLBSRSV) New Delhi,
 Rashtriya Sanskrit Vidyapeeth (RSV) Tirupati

Others 
 Kendriya Hindi Sansthan (KHS), Agra
 English and Foreign Language University (EFLU), Hyderabad
 National Council for Promotion of Urdu Language (NCPUL)
 University of Delhi (DU)
 National Council for Promotion of Sindhi Language (NCPSL)
 Three subordinate offices: Central Hindi Directorate (CHD), New Delhi; Commission for Scientific & Technological Terminology (CSTT), New Delhi; and Central Institute of Indian Languages (CIIL), Mysore
 Distance Education and Scholarships
 Indira Gandhi National Open University (IGNOU)
 UNESCO, International Cooperation, Book Promotion and Copyrights, Education Policy, Planning and Monitoring
 Integrated Finance Division.
 Statistics, Annual Plan and CMIS
 Administrative Reform, North Eastern Region, SC/ST/OBC

Others 
National Institute of Educational Planning and Administration (NIEPA)
National Book Trust (NBT)
National Board of Accreditation (NBA)
National Commission for Minority Educational Institutions (NCMEI)
National Institute of Open Schooling (NIOS)

Objectives
The main objectives of the ministry are:

Formulating the National Policy on Education and to ensure that it is implemented in letter and spirit
Planned development, including expanding access and improving quality of the educational institutions throughout the country, including in regions where people do not have easy access to education.
Paying special attention to disadvantaged groups like the poor, females and the minorities
Provide financial help in the form of scholarships, loan subsidy, etc. to deserving students from deprived sections of the society.
Encouraging international cooperation in the field of education, including working closely with the UNESCO and foreign governments as well as Universities, to enhance the educational opportunities in the country.

MoE's Innovation Cell (MIC)
MHRD's Innovation Cell, now renamed as MoE's Innovation Cell, was established in Aug 2018 by Ministry of Human Resource Development (MHRD) at All India Council for Technical Education (AICTE) to systematically foster the culture of innovation, entrepreneurship and startups in all major Higher Education Institutions in India. Abhay Jere was appointed as first Chief Innovation Officer.

Major initiatives of MIC
Smart India Hackathon (SIH)
Atal Ranking of Institutions on Innovation Achievements (ARIIA)
Institution's Innovation Council (IICs)
National Innovation and Start-up Policy for Students and Faculties in HEIs (NISP)
Innovation Ambassadors Program
MBA/PGDM program in Innovation, Entrepreneurship and Venture Development (IEV)

National Institutional Ranking Framework (NIRF)
In April 2016, Ministry of Human Resource Development published the first list of rankings of Indian colleges under National Institutional Ranking Framework. The entire ranking exercise involved NBA, All India Council for Technical Education, UGC, Thomson Reuters, Elsevier and INFLIBNET (Information & Library Network) centre. The ranking framework was launched in September 2015. All 122 centrally-funded institutions – including all central universities, IITs and IIMs – participated in the first round of ranking.

List of Ministers         

The Minister of Education, formerly the Minister of Human Resources Development (1985-2020), is the head of the Ministry of Education and one of the cabinet ministers of the Government of India.

List of Ministers of State

See also
National Institute of Technical Teachers' Training and Research, Chennai
Directorate of Language Planning and Implementation
U-DISE

Notes

References

External links
 Official website

 
Ministry of Education
India, Ministry of Education
India, Ministry of Education
1985 establishments in India